Hans onsdagsveninde is a 1943 Danish comedy film directed by Lau Lauritzen Jr. and Alice O'Fredericks.

It was based on the play Peter den store by Paul Sarauw, which premiered in 1930 at Det Ny Theater. The same play was also made into a Swedish film in 1946 under the title Onsdagsväninnan.

Cast
Peter Malberg as Balder Svanemose
Karl Gustav Ahlefeldt as Peter Engel
Maria Garland as Generalinden
Bodil Kjer as Magda Hansen
Johannes Meyer as Anton Hansen
Ib Schønberg as Butleren
Helge Kjærulff-Schmidt as Slagter Andersen
Knud Heglund as Doktoren
Svend Bille as Peter Engel's ven
Eigil Reimers as Reingaard
Petrine Sonne as Fru Larsen
Ingeborg Pehrson as Kioskdame
Henry Nielsen - Bartenderen

External links

1943 films
1940s Danish-language films
1943 comedy films
Danish black-and-white films
Films directed by Lau Lauritzen Jr.
Films directed by Alice O'Fredericks
Films scored by Sven Gyldmark
Danish comedy films